Aurèle Gervais (February 1, 1933 - December 25, 2021) was a Canadian former politician, who represented the electoral district of Timmins—Chapleau in the House of Commons of Canada from 1984 to 1988. He was a member of the Progressive Conservative Party.

Gervais was defeated in the 1988 election by Cid Samson. He died on December 25, 2021, at the age of 88.

References

External links
 

1933 births
2021 deaths
Franco-Ontarian people
Members of the House of Commons of Canada from Ontario
Progressive Conservative Party of Canada MPs
People from Timmins